Mark Maclure (born 14 July 1955) is a former Australian rules footballer in the Victorian Football League (VFL).

Originally from New South Wales club East Sydney, Maclure was recruited  by Carlton and made his senior VFL debut in Round 13, 1974. He retired from the game in 1986 after playing 243 games for the club.

Maclure was captain of Carlton for the 1986 season. He currently works as a football commentator for ABC Radio and appears once a week on AFL 360, Fox Footy's Monday to Thursday television program.

Career
Maclure played 243 games and booted 327 goals in a career that saw him become a 3 time Premiership player and an integral part of a magnificent era. Plucked from East Sydney in 1973, Maclure began his senior career in 1974 and was being groomed as a defender, a role he performed admirably in his early years.

Very sure overhead, he stood up in the big games and in the disappointing finals exits of 1975 and 1976, Maclure turned in some wonderful performances. He would finish 10th in the B&F in 75 and then =9th in 1976.

In 1977 he was pushed forward and it proved an excellent decision. His marking proved a great asset and despite the Blues missing the finals, Maclure booted 39 goals to win the clubs goalkicking and finish 4th in the B&F.

With the departure of Robert Walls early in 1978, Maclure would assume the role of centre half forward. His work rate and willingness to make space for the renowned mosquito fleet made him a vital component of the forward line. He also was prepared to protect his smaller teammates at any sign of trouble. He would finish 2nd in the B&F, boot 40 goals and was voted best afield in the sides Elimination Final win over Geelong.

In 1979, he would again prove an integral part of a side that was blessed with multiple goalscorers. Maclure would contribute 45 and finish 4th in the B&F, a Premiership season. Off field he was considered one of the leaders in the exploits of the players. His duels with Billy Picken during this era were must see. Maclure would often lower his colours but he would still find a way to contribute.

In 1980 he kicked 36 goals and in 1981 was voted Best Clubman in a Premiership season which was a true reflection of his status within the playing group.

In 1982, a back injury side lined him for nearly half the season but upon return he again was a solid contributor. His forward pressure was best highlighted when he won a disputed ball late in the last term to tap it onto Alex Marcou who drilled the sealing goal to give Carlton back to back flags.

His 1983 season was again hindered by his back injury and form issues. He would play just the 11 games. However his 1984 season was a welcome return to form. Despite not being a consistent goal scorer his willingness to work up the ground and create space behind him was recognised with a 3rd placing in the B&F.

In 1985 with the early season injury to Warren Ralph, Maclure played closer to goal and in Rd 4 v Geelong kicked a career high 7 goals. He would win his second leading goalkicker award with a career best 48 and for the 2nd time be voted Best Clubman. With the arrival of Robert Walls as coach, he was appointed club captain which was a wonderful tribute to his contribution to the club.

Sadly his 1986 was ravaged by further back issues and a broken wrist, which he manfully played with for the second part of the season. A 3-goal display in the Second Semi Final allowed Maclure the privilege of leading his side out onto the MCG on Grand Final day but he like the club had a day to forget and after some thought he would announce his retirement in a season he bravely played 20 games and booted 44 goals.

Post Carlton after stints at Brisbane, Sydney and Carlton in various coaching roles, he has become a commentator who pulls no punches on his take on the game and notably his beloved Blues.

External links
 Maclure at Blueseum
 Carlton Live

Carlton Football Club players
Carlton Football Club Premiership players
Australian rules footballers from New South Wales
East Sydney Australian Football Club players
1955 births
Living people
Three-time VFL/AFL Premiership players